Pierre Revilliod (1883–1954) was a Swiss naturalist.

From 1927–1953 Revilliod  was a curator and researcher at the Natural History Museum of Geneva. He is best known for 
his work on fossil bats and on the origin and descent of  farm animals.

Works
Partial list

 1917 Contribution à l'étude des Chiroptères des terrains tertiaires (1ère partie).Mémoires de la Société Paléontologique Suisse, vol. 43, p. 1-60.
 1919 L'état actuel de nos connaissances sur les Chiroptères fossiles (Note préliminaire) Compte Rendu des Séances de la Société de Physique et d'Histoire naturelle de Genève, vol. 36, n° 3, p. 93-96.
1920 Contribution à l'étude des Chiroptères des terrains tertiaires (2ème partie).Mémoires de la Société Paléontologique Suisse, vol. 44, p. 61-130.
1922 Contribution à l'étude des Chiroptères des terrains tertiaires (3ème partie et fin).Mémoires de la Société Paléontologique Suisse, vol. 45, p. 131-195.
1926. Sur les animaux domestiques de la station de I'epoque de La Tene de Geneve et sur le boeuf brachycephale de l'epoque Romaine. Arch. Sci. Phys.Phys. nat., vol. VIII, pp. 65–74.
1946 with Emile Dottrens La faune néolithique de la couche profonde de Saint-Aubin, Révue Suisse de Zoologie, tome 53, n. 33, Genève, pp. 739–775.

References
Aellen,  V. 1970  150 ans du Muséum d'Histoire naturelle de Genève. A. Kundig Genève, 37 p. (épuisé).
Sigrist, R. 1990 Les origines de la Société de Physique et d'Histoire naturelle (1790-1822). La science genevoise face au modèle français, Genève. Mémoires de la Société de Physique et d'Histoire naturelle: 45(1).
Sigrist, R. 1995. Les origines du Muséum d'histoire naturelle : 1794-1820. Revue des Musées de Genève (No spécial: Le Muséum d'histoire naturelle de Genève: 175 ans) 335: 2-6.

Swiss naturalists
1954 deaths
1883 births
20th-century naturalists